The following is a list of notable events that are related to Philippine music in 2010.

Events

January
 January 30 - The Pinoy Hiphoppaz Organization was launched.

February
 February 11 - David Benoit performed at PICC.
 February 14 - Raymond Lauchengco and sister Menchu Lauchengco-Yulo performed at Rockwell Tent.
 February 28 - Callalily held grand fans day.

July
 July 8 - Usher performed at SM Mall of Asia Concert Grounds.

Debuts

Soloist
 Aljur Abrenica (GMA/Sony)
 Joanna Ampil (Sony)
 Sherwin Baguion (Star Music/Sony)
 Jovit Baldivino (Star Music/Sony)
 Juris Fernandez (Star Music)
 Markki Stroem (Star Music/Sony)

Bands/groups
 100 Percent
 Eevee (Sony)
 Eurasia (Viva)
 Ezra Band (Star Music/Sony)
 General Luna (Warner)
 Kiss Jane (Sony)
 VoizBoys (Quantum Music/Star Music)
 XLR8 (Viva/P-Pop)
 The Zion Band

Reunion/comebacks
 Rachel Alejandro
 Brownman Revival
 Ely Buendia
 Gabby Concepcion
 KC Concepcion
 Amber Davis
 Bugoy Drilon
 Nikki Gil
 Toni Gonzaga
 Letter Day Story
 Martin Nievera
 Imelda Papin
 Aiza Seguerra
 Jay R
 Viktoria

Disbandment
 APO Hiking Society
 Bloomfields

Albums released

References

 
Philippines
Music
Philippine music industry